William Grant Stevenson,  (7 March 1849  – 6 May 1919) was a Scottish sculptor and portrait painter.

Life and work

Stevenson was born in Ratho in Midlothian on 7 March 1849.  His elder brother, David Watson Stevenson (1842–1904), was also a sculptor and an elected member of the Royal Scottish Academy.

Stevenson is most famous for his colossal bronze figure of Sir William Wallace, which stands on a high plinth of roughly hewn pink granite overlooking Union Terrace Gardens in Aberdeen. His bronze Robert Burns is the centrepiece of the Burns Monument, Kilmarnock, and copies are located in Milwaukee, Wisconsin (N. Prospect Ave.) and Denver, Colorado (City Park).

Stevenson had his studio at 13 Dalry Road and lived nearby at 63 Haymarket Terrace.

His most public work is his contribution of three figures to the Scott Monument on Princes Street in Edinburgh: Caleb Balderstone, Peter Peebles, and The Abbess. The three are somewhat lost within the huge complexity of the building, and its total of 68 figurative statues.

Stevenson also immortalized great figures of his time.  One of his subjects was James Carnegie, 9th Earl of Southesk (1827–1905).  In the portrayal the Earl is wearing his collar as a Knight of the Order of the Thistle, the highest honour which the monarch can bestow in Scotland.  The image is an uncompromising image of a man who was considered a powerful and romantic figure who had travelled the wilds of 19th century Canada.

In his later life Stevenson's studio was at 4 Belford Road near Dean Bridge. He lived at 8 Osborne Terrace.

He published the book Wee Johnnie Paterson in 1915.

Stevenson died on 6 May 1919, aged 70. He is buried with his brother, who preceded him in death by fifteen years, in Grange Cemetery in Edinburgh. The stone lies in the south-west section of the original cemetery and carries a bronze portrait of William by Henry Snell Gamley. His wife Jane Dickson (1855–1927) is also buried with him.

A painting of William Grant Stevenson by Charles Martin Hardie is held in the National Gallery of Scotland.

References

External links

1849 births
1919 deaths
20th-century British sculptors
19th-century British sculptors
Scottish sculptors
Scottish male sculptors
Sibling artists
People from Midlothian
Burials at the Grange Cemetery